Ángel Hugo Bargas (born 29 October 1946) is an Argentine former football defender. He represented Argentina at the 1974 FIFA World Cup.

Playing career
Bargas, born in Buenos Aires, Argentina, started his career at Racing Club in 1965 but he moved to Chacarita Juniors in 1966. He was part of the team that won Chacarita's only Primera División title in 1969.

In 1970 Bargas was awarded the Olimpia de Plata, which is given to the player of the year in Argentine football.

Bargas moved to France in 1972 to play for FC Nantes, he stayed in France for the rest of his career, he moved on to FC Metz in 1979, CS Louhans-Cuiseaux in 1981 and FC Le Puy in 1984.

Bargas retired in 1985, but he had a brief comeback at the age of 41 in 1988 with AS Angoulême.

International career

Bargas played 30 games for the Argentina national team between 1971 and 1974 scoring 1 goal.

Honours
 Chacarita Juniors
Argentine Primera División: Metropolitano 1969

 FC Nantes
Ligue 1: 1972–73, 1976–77

References

1946 births
Living people
Footballers from Buenos Aires
Argentine footballers
Argentina international footballers
Argentine expatriate footballers
Argentine expatriate sportspeople in France
Association football defenders
Racing Club de Avellaneda footballers
Chacarita Juniors footballers
FC Nantes players
FC Metz players
Louhans-Cuiseaux FC players
Angoulême Charente FC players
Argentine Primera División players
Ligue 1 players
Expatriate footballers in France
1974 FIFA World Cup players
Argentine football managers
Angoulême Charente FC managers
Talleres de Remedios de Escalada managers
Chacarita Juniors managers
Newell's Old Boys managers
Atlético de Rafaela managers
Le Puy Foot 43 Auvergne players